Charles S. Bierman (1845 – August 4, 1879) was an American professional baseball player who played one game for the Fort Wayne Kekiongas in 1871.  He went hitless in two at bats, had one walk, and committed two errors at first base. Bierman died in his hometown of Hoboken, New Jersey on August 4, 1879, and is interred at Hoboken Cemetery.

References

External links

Major League Baseball first basemen
New York Mutuals (NABBP) players
Troy Haymakers (NABBP) players
Morrisania Unions players
Baltimore Marylands (NABBP) players
Fort Wayne Kekiongas players
Baseball players from New Jersey
Sportspeople from Hoboken, New Jersey
19th-century baseball players
1845 births
1879 deaths